The Akai Shū (亜槐集) is a Japanese waka anthology.

Overview 
The Akai Shū is a personal collection (kashū) of the waka poetry of Asukai Masachika (飛鳥井雅親). It is in ten volumes.

Contents 
The Akai Shū was compiled by Masachika's eldest son Masatoshi (飛鳥井雅俊) following his father's death, and collects the best poems Masachika composed throughout his life. It contains 1,249 poems, although this is the result of the surviving manuscripts having one poem missing.

The collection is in ten books or scrolls. The first book consists of 100 poems composed in the summer of Bunshō 1 (1466). The second book consists of 100 poems composed as offerings to Sumiyoshi taisha in Bunmei 11 (1469) and 50 others. Books 3 through 6 are devoted to poems on the four seasons, books 7 and 8 to love poetry, and books 9 and 10 to poems on various topics (partings, travel and acrostics in book 9; laments, Buddhist and Shinto poems, and congratulations in book 10).

Textual tradition 
The first text of the work dates to Meiō 1 (1492), but the standard edition was probably completed at some time before Daiei 3 (1523).

Three forms of the 1492 text are in the manuscript held by the Matsudaira Archives in Shimabara, Nagasaki (島原松平文庫), the printed edition from the Kanbun-Jōkyō eras (1661–1688), and the manuscript held by the Archives and Mausolea Department of the Imperial Household Agency. The later edition is preserved in the manuscript in the holdings of the Tenri Central Library.

Notes

References

Works cited 

 

Waka (poetry)